Laukien is a surname. Notable people with the surname include:

 Frank Laukien (born 1960), German-American scientist and entrepreneur, son of Günther
 Günther Laukien (1923–1997), German physicist and entrepreneur
 Günther Laukien Prize